The BRM Argos is a Portuguese ultralight aircraft, designed and produced by BRM Costruções Aeronáuticas. The aircraft is supplied as a kit for amateur construction.

Design and development
The Argos was designed to comply with the Fédération Aéronautique Internationale microlight rules. It features a cantilever low-wing, a two-seats-in-side-by-side configuration enclosed cockpit, fixed tricycle landing gear and a single engine in tractor configuration.

The aircraft is made from 6061-T6 aluminum sheet, with its cockpit strengthened with steel roll-over protection. Standard engines available are the  Rotax 912ULS,  Jabiru 2200 and the  Jabiru 3300 four-stroke powerplants. Cockpit access is by two gull-winged doors

Specifications (Argos)

References

External links

2010s Portuguese ultralight aircraft
Homebuilt aircraft
Light-sport aircraft
Single-engined tractor aircraft
BRM Costruções Aeronáuticas aircraft